Oymapınar is a village in the Solhan District, Bingöl Province, Turkey. The village is populated by Kurds and had a population of 328 in 2021.

The hamlets of Aydın, Çataldere, Demirkapı, Derindere, Eğridere, Eskiköy, Haliller, Karaoluk and Şenlik are attached to the village.

References 

Villages in Solhan District
Kurdish settlements in Bingöl Province